Frensham Common is a large Site of Special Scientific Interest (SSSI) heathland of   which includes two lakes; it is owned by the National Trust.

Terrain, plants and animals
It lies almost wholly within Frensham, Surrey, a nucleated village on alluvial soil narrowly buffered to the north-west, connected by a path. The common supports few streams due to the permeability of the soil although the ground to the south-east is boggy.

Plants and animals
The site supports the sand lizard, smooth snake, woodlark, Dartford warbler and nightjar.

Lakes
Until the construction of reservoirs and a gravel extraction-related lake in the north of Surrey in the early 20th century, Frensham Great Pond was the largest lake in the county. The Great Pond and Frensham Little Pond were built during the Middle Ages to provide fish for the Bishop of Winchester's estate, developed by Bishop Henry of Blois, also known as Henry of Winchester, who established Farnham Castle to the north and who owned this and nearby manors.

Tourism
A hotel adjoins the south side of the Great Lake by the yachting area. One of the cottages on the common is available to rent.  The north of the lake has car parks and picnic areas.  North west of the common border is the small village of Frensham, which adjoins two hamlets further across the River Wey.

Less than 5% of the Common is within spurs of the common in Churt to the south or Tilford to the north.

Four prehistoric bowl barrows are in a straight line in the centre-east of the common.  Villagers termed these the King's Ridge Barrows.

During hot weather in 2018 large numbers of visitors flocked to Frensham Common, particularly Frensham Great Pond, causing an anti-social parking problem with cars parked on rural clearways, double yellow lines and also leaving behind large amounts of rubbish. Parking at both ponds carry charges, but payment can only be made digitally.

Notable events 
During the Second World War, tanks based in the Headley area used Frensham Common for training, whilst Canadian soldiers used to gallop across the Common. At this time, Frensham Great and Little Ponds were drained as otherwise they would have provided markers for German bombers.

Scenes in the 1959 film The Hound of the Baskervilles were shot on the common.

Scenes in the films Carry On Jack (1963) and Carry On Columbus (1992) were filmed on Frensham Great Pond.

Nautical scenes for the 1979 cinema film The Riddle of the Sands were recorded on the Frensham Ponds.

In 1966 the common was used as a stand-in for the Battle of Culloden in the 4 part Doctor Who serial The Highlanders.

The lakes were used as a film location for the 1999 film The Mummy, posing as the river Nile.

In 2010,  of the common, in very dry conditions, burned.

References

External links

Easy walks around Surrey > Frensham Common from Surrey County Council

Sites of Special Scientific Interest in Surrey
Parks and open spaces in Surrey
Borough of Waverley
Lakes of Surrey